Turnersville is an unincorporated community and census-designated place (CDP) located within Washington Township, in Gloucester County, New Jersey, United States. As of the 2010 United States Census, the CDP's population was 3,742.

It is named after the Turner family, one of the original families of Washington Township. The area falls under the 08012 ZIP code for Blackwood.

Geography
According to the United States Census Bureau, Turnersville had a total area of 1.495 square miles (3.871 km2), including 1.487 square miles (3.851 km2) of land and 0.008 square miles (0.020 km2) of water (0.51%). It is located on the South Branch Big Timber Creek. New Jersey Route 42 forms its eastern boundary and interchanges with the western terminus of the Atlantic City Expressway there. The CDP has a humid subtropical climate (Cfa) and average monthly temperatures range from 33.2° F in January to 77.1° F in July. The local hardiness zone is 7a.

Demographics

Census 2010

Census 2000
As of the 2000 United States Census there were 3,867 people, 1,167 households, and 1,060 families living in the CDP. The population density was 1,002.1/km2 (2,603.4/mi2). There were 1,179 housing units at an average density of 305.5/km2 (793.7/mi2). The racial makeup of the CDP was 92.68% White, 3.67% African American, 0.03% Native American, 2.48% Asian, 0.03% Pacific Islander, 0.39% from other races, and 0.72% from two or more races. Hispanic or Latino of any race were 1.45% of the population.

There were 1,167 households, out of which 49.4% had children under the age of 18 living with them, 81.3% were married couples living together, 7.5% had a female householder with no husband present, and 9.1% were non-families. 7.0% of all households were made up of individuals, and 3.6% had someone living alone who was 65 years of age or older. The average household size was 3.31 and the average family size was 3.49.

In the CDP the population was spread out, with 29.8% under the age of 18, 7.9% from 18 to 24, 27.0% from 25 to 44, 27.5% from 45 to 64, and 7.8% who were 65 years of age or older. The median age was 37 years. For every 100 females, there were 93.5 males. For every 100 females age 18 and over, there were 89.7 males.

The median income for a household in the CDP was $86,421, and the median income for a family was $90,863. Males had a median income of $59,911 versus $43,929 for females. The per capita income for the CDP was $28,734. About 2.2% of families and 3.1% of the population were below the poverty line, including 2.7% of those under age 18 and none of those age 65 or over.

Notable people

People who were born in, residents of, or otherwise closely associated with Turnersville include:
 Linda Fiorentino (born 1958), actress.
 Mike Rossman (born 1955), boxer, WBA light-heavyweight champion.

References

Census-designated places in Gloucester County, New Jersey
Washington Township, Gloucester County, New Jersey